Bretten may refer to:

 Bretten, a town in the state of Baden-Württemberg, Germany
 Bretten station, a rail transport in the town of Bretten in the German state of Baden-Württemberg
 Bretten, Haut-Rhin, a commune in the Haut-Rhin department in Alsace in north-eastern France